Daryl Hoole is an author and public speaker from Salt Lake City, Utah.  The main themes of her written works and speeches are home management and family living.  She has authored six books and given numerous discourses on these themes.

Biography
Daryl Hoole is an author and lecturer on home management and family living.  She has written six published books and has lectured on this topic extensively throughout the United States and Canada. Daryl's lecturing included speaking at Education Week, a conference held at Brigham Young University, for close to 40 years.

Earlier in her life, she served as a Latter-day Saint missionary in the Netherlands, where her father presided as mission president. Years later, she served with her husband Hendricus (Hank) when he was called as mission president of that same mission. Recently, she served a third mission when she and her husband were called as welfare-humanitarian administrators for the Church of Jesus Christ of Latter-day Saints in Asia.  Based in Hong Kong, Daryl and her husband traveled, taught and provided service throughout much of Asia for two years.  Other significant service contributions for Daryl include her service on the Church's General Board of its Primary organization.

Daryl and Hank are the parents of eight living children and have thirty-six grandchildren and an ever-growing number of great-grandchildren.  She currently resides in Salt Lake City, Utah.  Though now mostly retired, Daryl is still in demand as a speaker for women’s groups and is a regular contributor to the Latter-day Saint-oriented website Meridian Magazine.

Published works
The Art of Teaching Children 1964
With Sugar ‘N Spice (with Donette V. Ockey) 1966
The Art of Homemaking 1967
The Joys of Homemaking 1975
Our Own Society 1979
A House of Order 1984
The Ultimate Career: The Art of Homemaking Today 2005
Little Things That Can Make A Big Difference (CD)

Fans 

Deseret Book reports that typical readers of Daryl Hoole’s publications are members of the Church of Jesus Christ of Latter-day Saints who place high importance on the value of home life and families; however, Hoole has followers in family-oriented people of diverse faiths and circumstances. Meridian Magazine asserts that, "Daryl Hoole is truly a master of the art of Homemaking."

Sources 

1934 births
Living people
Female Mormon missionaries
American Mormon missionaries in Hong Kong
20th-century Mormon missionaries
American Mormon missionaries in the Netherlands
Writers from Salt Lake City
Mission presidents (LDS Church)
American leaders of the Church of Jesus Christ of Latter-day Saints
Latter Day Saints from Utah